Collagen, type XXIV, alpha 1 is a protein that in humans is encoded by the COL24A1 gene.

Model organisms
Model organisms have been used in the study of COL24A1 function. A conditional knockout mouse line called Col24a1tm1b(EUCOMM)Wtsi was generated at the Wellcome Trust Sanger Institute. Male and female animals underwent a standardized phenotypic screen to determine the effects of deletion. Additional screens performed:  - In-depth immunological phenotyping - in-depth bone and cartilage phenotyping

References

External links